Booragul railway station is located on the Main Northern line in New South Wales, Australia. It serves the City of Lake Macquarie suburb of Booragul opening on 24 October 1926.

The original station buildings were extensively damaged in the 1989 Newcastle earthquake, resulting in their demolition and replacement with the current structures.

A housing development west of the station is currently under construction, however, there is no convenient access to the railway station, and will likely do little to increase patronage (which averaged at 110 passengers per day in 2013).

Platforms & services
Booragul has one island platform with two faces. It is serviced by NSW TrainLink Central Coast & Newcastle Line services travelling from Sydney Central to Newcastle.

References

External links

Booragul station details Transport for New South Wales

Railway stations in the Hunter Region
Railway stations in Australia opened in 1926
Regional railway stations in New South Wales
Short-platform railway stations in New South Wales, 4 cars
Main North railway line, New South Wales
City of Lake Macquarie